was a Japanese film actor. He appeared in 100 films between 1954 and 2005. He and his younger brothers Masakazu and Ryō were known as the three Tamura brothers. They were sons of actor Tsumasaburo Bando.

Biography
Tamura graduated from Doshisha University. Tamura was working for a trading firm before he started his acting career but he decided to be an actor to repay his father Tsumasaburō's debt. In 1953, he joined Shochiku and made his film debut with Onna no Sono. In 1965, he won the Best Supporting Actor award at the 16th Blue Ribbon Awards for his role in The Hoodlum Soldier. In 1970, he played the role of Mitsuo Fuchida in Tora! Tora! Tora!. Tamura won the Mainichi Film Award for Best Actor award for his role in Muddy River in 1981.

On television, Tamura appeared in a lot of jidaigeki television dramas. In 1964, He appeared for the first time in an NHK taiga drama, Akō Rōshi. NHK tapped him the following year for the role of Kuroda Yoshitaka in Taikōki. Among the jidaigeki series he has starred in Hissatsu series Tasukenin Hashiru.

He died of cerebral infarction on 19 May 2006. His final film appearance was in The Yakiniku mubi: Purukogi, released in 2007.

Selected filmography

Film

 The Garden of Women (1954) - Sankichi Shimoda, Yoshie's boyfriend
 Twenty-Four Eyes (1954) - Isokichi
 Tooi kumo (1955) - Keizō Ishizu
 She Was Like a Wild Chrysanthemum (1955)
 Farewell to Dream (1956) - Sudō
 Namida (1956)
 Kyoraku gonin otoko (1956)
 Sora yukaba (1957) - Jirō Yoshino
 Akuma no kao (1957) - Kikuo Furushima
 Times of Joy and Sorrow (1957) - Mr. Nozu
 Musume sanbagarasu (1957)
 Ten no me (1957)
 Samurai Nippon (1957)
 Otoko no kiba (1957)
 Stakeout (1958) - Kyūichi Ishii, the murderer
 Kono ten no niji (1958) - Shirō Machimura
 Haru o matsu hitobito (1959)
 Karatachi nikki (1959)
 Kaze no naka no hitomi (1959) - Mr. Terajima
 Thus Another Day (1959) - Tetsuo Mori
 Teki wa honnoji ni ari (1959) - Oda Nobunaga
 Asa o yobu kuchibue (1959)
 The River Fuefuki (1960) - Sadahei
 Hatamoto Gurentai (1960) 
 Onna no hashi (1961) - Toshiya Kawazu
 Kako (1961)
 Haitoku no mesu (1961) - Hideo Ue
 Nippon no obaachan (1962) - Fukuda
 Mitasareta seikatsu (1962) - Sadakichi
 Sanga ari (1961) - Yoshio Inoue
 Yama no sanka: moyuru wakamono tachi (1962)
 Kaachan kekkon shiroyo (1962)
 Utae Wakôdotachi (1963)
 Mushukunin-betsuchô (1963) - Yokouchi
 Kekkonshiki Kekkonshiki (1963) - Ryûji Matsuda
 Tange Sazen: zankoku no kawa (1963)
 Ninja-gari (1964) - Tosa Aizawa
 Nihon kyôkaku-den (1964) - Tsurumatsu
 Revenge (1964) - Jubei
 Goben no tsubaki (1964) - Chodayu
 Tokugawa Ieyasu (1965)
 The Forest of No Escape (1965) - Hidemichi Kusuo
 The Hoodlum Soldier (1965) - Arita
 Seisaku no tsuma (1965) - Seisaku
 Miyamoto Musahi V (1965) - Yagyu Tajima
 Hoodlum Soldier and the C.O (1965)
 Kanto hamonjo (1965)
 Hana to Ryu (1965)
 Shinobi no Mono 4: Siege (1966) - Daijuro Fuma
 Yojōhan monogatari: Shōfu shino (1966) - Tadashi Yoshioka
 Nyohan hakai (1966) - Hinata
 Hoodlum Soldier Deserts Again (1966)
 Sora ippai no namida (1966)
 Kinokawa (1966) - Shintani Keisaku, Hana's husband
 Heitai yakuza datsugoku (1966)
 Shiroi Kyotō (1966) - Shûji Satomi - Assistant professor
 Shin heitai yakuza (1966)
 Heitai yakuza daidassō (1966)
 Hana To Ryu: Do Kâiwan No Kêttō (1966)
 Satogashi ga kowareru toki (1967) - Katsumi Gorai
 Daraku suru onna (1967) - Miyoshi
 Heitai yakuza nagurikomi (1967)
 Utage (1967) - Asaichi Isobe
 Heitai yakuza ore ni makasero (1967)
 Hoodlum Soldier on the Attack (1967)
 Âa Kimi ga Ai (1967) - Yûichi Ono
 Sleepy Eyes of Death: Hell Is a Woman (1968) - Naruse Tatsuma
 Nemureru bijo (1968) - Eguchi
 Ôoku emaki (1968) - Shogun
 Gion Matsuri (1968) - Sukematsu
 Heitai yakuza godatsu (1968)
 Keimusho yaburi (1969)
 Red Lion (1969) - Sōzō Sagara
 Shinsengumi (1969) - Koshitarō Itō
 Akumyo ichiban shobu (1969) - Masakichi
 Mushyô yaburi (1969)
 Senso to nigen (1970)
 Tora! Tora! Tora! (1970) - Lt. Commander Mitsuo Fuchida
 Tenkan no abarembo (1970)
 Tekkaba bojô (1970)
 Senketsu no kiroku (1970)
 Shin heitai yakuza: Kasen (1972) - Arita
 Hanzo the Razor (1972) - Harada Kahei
 Seigen-ki (1973) - Minoru Oyama
 The Twilight Years (1973) - Nobuyoshi Tachibana
 Karafuto 1945 Summer Hyosetsu no mon (1975)
 The Last Samurai (1974) - Ikemoto Mohei
 Tsuma to Onna no Aida (1976) - Masayuki
 Death at an Old Mansion (1976) - Ichiyanagi Kenzou
 Furenzoku satsujin jiken (1977) - Senbei Yashirō
 Empire of Passion (1978) - Gisaburō
 Never Give Up (1978) - Urakawa, pressman
 Ore-tachi no kokyogaku (1979)
 Shōdō satsujin: Musuko yo (1979) - Hirayama
 Jigoku no mushi (1979) - Danjurō
 Nichiren (1979) - Nukina Shigetada
 Dōran (1980) - Kanzaki
 Tempyō no Iraka (1980) - Jianzhen
 The Young Rebels (1980)
 Harukanaru Sōro (1980) - Toyota Sakichi
 Muddy River (1981) - Shinpei Itakura
 Himeyuri no Tō (1982) - Lt. Col. Sasaki
 Dai Nippon teikoku (1982) - Sada Shimomura
 Kare no ootobai, kanojo no shima (1986) - Kouichiroh Shiraishi
 Katayoku dake no tenshi (1986)
 Oedipus no Ｙaiba (1986) - Shuehei Osako
 The Sea and Poison (1986) - Professor Hashimoto
 Hachiko Monogatari (1987) - Furukawa
 Itazu - Kuma (1987) - Ginzo
 The Silk Road (1988) - Tsao Yanhui
 226 (1989) - Sohei Yuasa
 Senba-zuru (1989) - Doctor
 Toki rakujitsu (1992) - Ryutaro
 Rakuyô (1992) - Yamashiro
 Watashi o daite soshite kisu shite (1992) - Shigeki Kabayama
 Gekko no natsu (1993)
 Crest of Betrayal (1994) - Kôzukenosuke Kira
 Sleeping Man (1996) - Denjihei
 Sanctuary: The Movie (1996)
 Hisai (1998) - Yoshio Miyarabe
 Chinpao chin ho-teki koji (1999)
 Komugironotenshi sugare oi (1999) - Kumatarō
 I Love Friends (2001)
 Letters from the Mountains (2002) - Shigenaga Kōda
 Jōhatsu Tabinikki (2003)
 I Love Peace (2003) - Kashiwabara
 The Yakiniku Mubi: Purukogi (2007) - Kan
 Kuchita Teoshi Guruma (produced in 1984 but released in 2014) - Yasuda Tadao

Television
Akō Rōshi (1964) - Takada Gunbei
Taikōki (1965) - Kuroda Kanbei
Daichūshingura (1971) - Takadaya Gunbei
Haru no Sakamichi (1971) - Takuan
Tasukenin Hashiru (1973) - Nakayama Bunjūrō
The Water Margin (1973) - Chai Jin
Onihei Hankachō (1975) - Kishii Samanosuke
On'yado Kawasemi (1980-1983) - Kamibayashi
Kawaite sōrō  (1984) - Tokugawa Yoshimune
Miyamoto Musashi (1984–85) - Nagaoka Sado
Ōedo Sōsamō (1990-91) - Matsudaira Sadanobu
Onihei Hankachō Season2 episode12 Guest starring (1991) - Amagoi Shozaemon
Kemonomichi (2006) - Doctor

Honours
 Mainichi Film Award for Best Actor (1981)
 Medal with Purple Ribbon (1991)
 Order of the Rising Sun, 4th Class, Gold Rays with Rosette (1999)

References

External links
 
 Takahiro Tamura on NHK

1928 births
2006 deaths
Japanese male film actors
Male actors from Kyoto
Recipients of the Medal with Purple Ribbon
Recipients of the Order of the Rising Sun, 4th class